Tales from the Vienna Woods is a 1928 German silent film directed by Jaap Speyer and starring Albert Paulig, Magnus Stifter, and Eric Barclay. The title refers to the waltz Tales from the Vienna Woods by Johann Strauss.

The film's sets were designed by Willi Herrmann.

Cast

References

Bibliography

External links

1928 films
Films of the Weimar Republic
German silent feature films
Films directed by Jaap Speyer
German black-and-white films